Peter Stronach (born 1 September 1956) is an English former professional footballer who played as a winger in the Football League for Sunderland and York City, and in non-League football for Chester-le-Street. He was an England schools international.

References

1956 births
Living people
Sportspeople from Seaham
Footballers from County Durham
English footballers
England schools international footballers
Association football midfielders
Sunderland A.F.C. players
York City F.C. players
Chester-le-Street Town F.C. players
English Football League players